Witbank Stadium is a multi-purpose stadium in eMalahleni, South Africa.

The stadium was initially known as the Johann van Riebeeck Stadium until 2000, before sponsorship deals saw its name changed to @lantic Park and Witbank Mica Stadium. When these sponsorship deals ended, it was known as the Puma Stadium before becoming the Witbank Stadium.

References

Soccer venues in South Africa
Rugby union stadiums in South Africa
Sports venues in Mpumalanga
Emalahleni Local Municipality, Mpumalanga